The Werner projection is a pseudoconic equal-area map projection sometimes called the Stab-Werner or Stabius-Werner projection. Like other heart-shaped projections, it is also categorized as cordiform. Stab-Werner refers to two originators: Johannes Werner (1466–1528), a parish priest in Nuremberg, refined and promoted this projection that had been developed earlier by Johannes Stabius (Stab) of Vienna around 1500.

The projection is a limiting form of the Bonne projection, having its standard parallel at one of the poles (90°N/S). Distances along each parallel and along the central meridian are correct, as are all distances from the north pole.

See also
List of map projections

References

External links

.

Map projections
Equal-area projections